Foiwe Info Global Solutions Pvt Ltd is an Indian multinational information technology company that provides business consulting, information technology and outsourcing services. The company is founded in Bangalore and also headquartered in Bangalore, India with operations in two countries. The company began in 2010 as a Limited Liability Partnership company and was converted to a Private Limited company in 2019.  The company is registered with Ministry of Corporate Affairs, India.

History

Formation 
Foiwe originated as the business and an IT product development company in Indian and global market. With the expansion of social media and online dating, the firm also entered into the Enterprise content moderation and IT Services.

Later the company expanded its interests into server monitoring services, application development, and added many small and large organizations to its client list. The small and medium enterprises market segment became the major contributor towards total revenue. 
The company in 2015 and 2016, brought two outsourcing companies. 
The group today employs around 1000 employees in different locations.

Operations 
Employees

Foiwe had a total of 1032 employees as of 2020, out of which 42% were women. Out of its total workforce, 10% are software professionals, 60% are enterprise content management professionals and remaining 30% for support and sales. In 2020, 83% of its employees were based in India. These numbers do not include its subsidiaries. As a part of the graduate hiring program 2020, Foiwe has empaneled 11 colleges across Karnataka and West Bengal for fresher recruitment drive.

Foiwe has multiple offices in India. The headquarters being in Bangalore, Foiwe has delivery centers in Kolkata, Ahmedabad and Kazan.

Products and Services

Foiwe organizes its services and people in these five primary cross-functional groupings i.e., Enterprise Content Moderation, Technology, Contact Center Operations, Digital Transformation and Business Process Outsourcing. Foiwe's client engagement teams typically consist of a combination of industry experts, capability specialists and professionals with expert domain knowledge.

Foiwe achieved 100% work from home (WFH) goal within the first week of Government Announced Lockdown during Covid Pandemic in 2020.

Principal subsidiaries
 Proflakes Smart Solutions Pvt Ltd. is the subsidiary of Foiwe with its head office in Kolkata.
 Howlader Ventures Pvt Ltd, founded in 2013, is the technology subsidiary of Foiwe with its head office in Bangalore.
 CarZippi - A doorstep automotive service provider in India.

References

External links
 
 Government of India, MCA
 Entrepreneur Year Book 2012
 
  Indian Television
  Indian content moderators' win from data policies in India & Europe
  Meet The Internet's New Cops
  Content moderation firms ramping up local language support in India amid growing clientele
  Scrubbing the net: The content moderators

Outsourcing companies
Outsourcing in India
Consulting firms established in 2010
Android (operating system) development software
Business process outsourcing companies
2010 establishments in West Bengal